The 1946–47 season was Newport County's first competitive season in the Football League Second Division. The club had been promoted at the end of the 1938–39 season and although play had started in the 1939–40 season it was abandoned due to the outbreak of war in Europe.

Season review

Results summary

Results by round

Fixtures and results

Second Division

FA Cup

Welsh Cup

League table

External links
 Newport County 1946-1947 : Results
 Newport County football club match record: 1947
 Welsh Cup 1946/47

References

 Amber in the Blood: A History of Newport County. 

1946-47
English football clubs 1946–47 season
1946–47 in Welsh football